Balthasar Cordier (Corderius) (b. at Antwerp, 7 June 1592; d. at Rome, 24 June 1650) was a Belgian Jesuit exegete and editor of patristic works. He entered the Society of Jesus in 1612, and after teaching Greek, moral theology, and Sacred Scripture, devoted himself to translating and editing manuscripts of Greek catenae and other works of the Greek Fathers, for which he searched the libraries of Europe.

Works

He published the following:

(1) Catena sexaginta quinque Patrum græcorum in S. Lucam" (Antwerp, 1628);
(2) Catena Patrum græcorum in S. Joannem" (Antwerp, 1630);
(3) Joannis Philoponi in cap. I Geneseos ... libri septem" (Antwerp, 1630);
(4) S. Cyrilli apologiæ morales" (Vienna, 1630);
(5) Opera S. Dionysii Areopagitæ cum S. Maximi scholiis" (Antwerp, 1634);
(6) Expositio Patrum græcorum in Psalmos" (Antwerp, 1643–46);
(7) Symbolæ in Matthæum" (2 vols., of which, however, only the second is by him; Toulouse, 1646–47);
(8) S. Dorothei archimandritæ institutiones asceticæ" (Antwerp, 1646);
(9) S. P. N. Cyrilli archiepiscopi Alexandini homiliæ XIX in Jeremiam" (Antwerp, 1648) – in this case his critical acumen was at fault; these homilies are Origen's.

He is also the author of a commentary on the Book of Job, "Job Illustratus" (Antwerp, 1646; reprinted in Migne's Cursus S. Scripturæ". XIII and XIV, and in Campon's edition of Cornelius a Lapide).

References

Attribution
 The entry cites:
Sommervogel, Biblioth. de la c. de J., II, 1438, s. v.;
Hugo von Hurter, Nomenclator.

1592 births
1650 deaths
Jesuits of the Spanish Netherlands
17th-century translators